Gammaracanthus is a genus of crustaceans belonging to the monotypic family Gammaracanthidae.

The species of this genus are found in Europe and Northern America.

Species:

Gammaracanthus aestuariorum 
Gammaracanthus caspius 
Gammaracanthus lacustris 
Gammaracanthus loricatus

References

Amphipoda